Kong koi or Phi Kong Koi is a Lao and Thai jungle ghost. Their appearance is not easily characterized, but often described as a phantom with one leg. They move by hopping with one leg and shout, "Koi, koi, koi". Some people believe it has a fly-like tube mouth. Others describe it as looking like monkey or langur. Most agree this ghost is ugly and cannot climb trees, which is unusual in nature. It is believed that the Phi Kong Koi will suck blood from the toes of the sleeping traveler in the jungle; travelers should keep the feet together or cross their feet when sleeping to protect themselves.

Sakai, here, most likely refers to, either, the more generally used (at least in Malaysia) Orang Asli, or the Semang.  
Luang Pu Waen Suciṇṇo (former abbot of Wat Doi Mae Pang, Chiang Mai province) said that when he traveled in the jungle in Khammouane, Laos, with Luang Pu Tue Ajala Thamฺmo, they fought with many Phi Kong Koi at night. He described the Phi Kong Koi as being shaped like children of about 13–14 years old. They were thin with a bulging belly, dark brown skin, dark hair, and a chubby nose. They were armed with a small crossbows or arrows and shouted "Koi". Luang Pu Waen and fellow travelers were meditating, which protected them from the Phi Kong Koi. At dawn, the Phi Kong Koi surrendered and invited both of them to their home. 

Some have suggested, based on this story, that the Phi Kong Koi are really the Kha Ra Dae an ethnic group. This indicates that in the above story, they were hunting and possibly killing intruding humans and taking the meat to eat.

In the faith of Tai Dam people in Nong Sung district, Mukdahan province, they believe that Phi Kong Koi is a long-haired, very small (childlike) woman with a backwards foot. They speak the opposite of reality.

In September 2016, strange footprint were found at a cave in the forest in Loei province. Believed to be the footprints of Phi Kong Koi, the director of a local cultural agency said Phi Kong Koi are real and that they are ethnic group whose has not been seen for a long time.

Similar creatures
Jiangshi: Chinese hopping vampire
Madam Koi Koi: African demon walking with hopping with one heel
Patasola: one legged female vampire in jungle of South America
Shanxiao: Chinese mountain one legged hairy creature
Nasnas: In Arabian folklore it is a one legged type of Jinn, said to be the offsprings of Shiqq and Humans.

Notes

References

Thai ghosts
Vampires
Mythological monsters
Folk religion